Martin Gleeson (14 August 1875 – 17 October 1918) was a South African cricketer. He played in two first-class matches for Eastern Province in 1893/94 and 1896/97.

See also
 List of Eastern Province representative cricketers

References

External links
 

1875 births
1918 deaths
South African cricketers
Eastern Province cricketers
People from County Kildare